The Great Sphinx of Tanis is a granite sculpture of a sphinx, whose date may be as early as the 26th century BC. It was discovered in the ruins of the Temple of Amun-Ra in Tanis, Egypt's capital during the 21st Dynasty and the 23rd Dynasty.  It was created much earlier, but when exactly remains debated with hypotheses of the 4th Dynasty or the 12th Dynasty. All that is left of its original inscription are the parts alluding to pharaohs Amenemhat II (12th Dynasty), Merneptah (19th Dynasty) and Shoshenq I (22nd Dynasty). 

The Louvre acquired it in 1826 as part of the second Egyptian collection of Henry Salt, whose purchase was led on behalf of the French state by Jean-François Champollion. Initially plans were made to place it outdoors, at the center of the Cour Carrée, but they were not implemented. In the mid-1930s, the Sphinx was transferred to its present location in the crypt created by Louvre architect Albert Ferran to connect the two halves of the southern wing of the Cour Carrée.

See also
 Sphinx of Memphis

Notes

26th-century BC works
1826 archaeological discoveries
3rd-millennium BC sculptures
Egyptian antiquities of the Louvre
Sculptures of ancient Egypt
Nile Delta
Sphinxes
Tanis